Major "Mule" Holley Jr. (July 10, 1924 – October 25, 1990) was an American jazz upright bassist.

Biography
Holley was born in Detroit, Michigan, United States. He attended the prestigious Cass Technical High School in Detroit. Holley played violin and tuba when young. He started playing bass while serving in the Navy, playing in the Ships Company A Band at Camp Robert Smalls, which was led by Leonard Bowden and included Clark Terry, and several other musicians recruited from civilian dance bands. In the latter half of the 1940s, he played with Dexter Gordon, Charlie Parker, and Ella Fitzgerald; in 1950 he and Oscar Peterson recorded duets, and he also played with Peterson and Charlie Smith as a trio. He was married to Minnie Walton (born Millicent Aitcheson).

In the mid-1950s, he moved to England and worked at the BBC. Upon his return to America, he toured with Woody Herman in 1958 and with Al Cohn/Zoot Sims between 1959 and 1960. A prolific studio musician, he played with Duke Ellington in 1964 and with the Kenny Burrell Trio, Coleman Hawkins, Lee Konitz, Roy Eldridge, Michel Legrand, Milt Buckner, Jay McShann and Quincy Jones in the 1960s and 1970s. From 1967 to 1970, he taught at the Berklee College of Music.

Holley was known for singing along with his arco (bowed) bass solos, a technique Slam Stewart also used. Holley and Stewart recorded two albums together.

Holley died of a heart attack in Maplewood, New Jersey, at the age of 66.

Discography

As leader
 Two Big Mice with Slam Stewart (Black and Blue, 1977) 
 Shut Yo' Mouth! with Slam Stewart (PM, 1987) 
 Major Step with Joe Van Enkhuizen (Timeless 1992) 
 Excuse Me Ludwig (Black and Blue, 1997) 
 Mighty Like a Rose with Rose Murphy (Black & Blue, 1998)

As sideman
With Peter Appleyard
 Barbados Heat (Concord Jazz, 1990)
 Barbados Cool (Concord Jazz, 1991)

With Kenny Burrell
 Midnight Blue (Blue Note, 1963)
 Bluesy Burrell (Moodsville, 1963)
 Bluesin' Around (Columbia, 1983)

With Eddie "Lockjaw" Davis
 Light and Lovely (Black and Blue, 1979)
 Midnight Slows Vol. 10 (Black and Blue, 1979)

With Coleman Hawkins
 Good Old Broadway (Moodsville, 1962)
 Today and Now (Impulse!, 1962)
 The Jazz Version of No Strings (Moodsville, 1962)
 Hawkins! Eldridge! Hodges! Alive! At the Village Gate! (Verve, 1962)
 Hawkins! Alive! At the Village Gate (Verve, 1963)
 Coleman Hawkins Plays Make Someone Happy from Do Re Mi (Moodsville, 1963)
 Desafinado (Impulse!, 1963)
 Back in Bean's Bag (Columbia, 1963)

With Jo Jones
 Papa Jo and His Friends (Denon, 1978)
 Our Man, Papa Jo! (Denon, 1978)

With Quincy Jones
 Quincy Jones Plays Hip Hits (Mercury, 1963)
 Quincy Jones Explores the Music of Henry Mancini (Mercury, 1964)
 Gula Matari (A&M, 1970)
 I Heard That!! (A&M, 1976)

With B.B. King
 Blues 'N' Jazz (MCA, 1983)

With Roland Kirk
 Here Comes the Whistleman (Atlantic, 1967)
 A Meeting of the Times (Atlantic, 1972)

With Buddy Tate
 The Texas Twister (Master Jazz 1975)
 Just Jazz (Uptown, 1984)
 Just Friends (Muse, 1992)

With Clark Terry
 Tread Ye Lightly (Cameo, 1964)
 Having Fun (Delos, 1990)

With Joe Williams
 Having the Blues Under European Sky (Denon, 1985)

With others
 Totti Bergh, Major Blues (Gemini, 1991)
 Milt Buckner, Block Chords Parade (Black & Blue, 1974)
 Jaki Byard, Family Man (Muse, 1978)
 Johnny Guarnieri, Johnny Guarnieri Originals (1979)
 Bob James, Sign of the Times (1981)
 Rufus Jones, Five on Eight (Cameo, 1964)
 Dave McKenna, Dave McKenna Quartet with Zoot Sims (Chiaroscuro, 1974)
 Jay McShann, Some Blues (Chiaroscuro, 1993)
 Flip Phillips, The Claw (Chiaroscuro, 1986)
 Richie Pratt, Olathe (Artists Recording Collective, 2007)
 Hilton Ruiz, Crosscurrents (Stash, 1985)
 Shirley Scott, The Soul Is Willing (Prestige, 1963)
 Shirley Scott, Drag 'em Out (Prestige, 1963)
 Frank Sinatra, L.A. Is My Lady (Qwest, 1984)
 Stanley Turrentine, Never Let Me Go (1963)
 Dicky Wells, Bones for the King (Felsted, 1958)
 Dicky Wells, Trombone Four-in-Hand (Felsted, 1959)
 Gerry Wiggins, Wig Is Here (Black & Blue, 1974)
 Phil Woods, Directly from the Half Note (Philology, 1966)

References

1924 births
1991 deaths
American jazz double-bassists
Male double-bassists
Cass Technical High School alumni
Jazz musicians from Michigan
People from Maplewood, New Jersey
Duke Ellington Orchestra members
20th-century American musicians
20th-century double-bassists
American male jazz musicians
Black & Blue Records artists
20th-century American male musicians
United States Navy personnel of World War II